Mary Jane Cruz-Mendoza (born August 29, 1966), known professionally as Jamie Rivera, is a pop singer from the Philippines and also known as the Inspirational Diva.

Since her post-EDSA Revolution debut album Hey It's Me, Rivera has had five gold and two platinum-selling albums issued by PARI. Rivera has sung to Pope John Paul II, and played the role of Kim in the Miss Saigon musical at the Theatre Royal, Drury Lane, in the West End of London, England. Most recently, she is known for singing the theme song of the Papal Visit 2015 We Are All God's Children. She also met Pope Francis during his Apostolic visit to the Philippines on January 15–19, 2015.

Family and education
Rivera is a Roman Catholic. She is married to JB Mendoza and has a daughter named Reine Mendoza, who was born on December 12, 1996.

She graduated from University of Santo Tomas with a degree in Economics.

Discography

Studio albums
Hey It's Me (debut album) (PolyEast Records, 1987)
All Out for Love (PolyEast Records, 1988)
We Can Show the World (PolyEast Records, 1990)
Pangako (PolyEast Records, 1993)
Second Thoughts (PolyEast Records, 1994)
Once More (Star Music, 1996) Gold award
Feels So Right (Star Music, 1999) Gold award
Heal Our Land (Star Music, 2001) Gold award
Seasons (Star Music, 2001)
The Purpose Driven Life (Star Music, 2004) Gold & Platinum awards
Inspirations (Star Music, 2012) Gold award
My Christmas Gift (Star Music, 2013) Gold award
We Are All God's Children (Star Music, 2015) Gold & Platinum awards

Compilation albums
Greatest Hits (PolyEast Records, 1991)
OPM Timeless Collection (PolyEast Records, 1997)
Sa Araw ng Pasko (Star Music, 1998) Platinum award
The Story of Jamie Rivera: Ultimate OPM Collection (PolyEast Records, 2001)
Jamie Rivera... At Her Best (Star Music, 2005)
Best of Jamie Rivera (Star Music, 2013)
Hey It's Me, Jamie!: 30th Anniversary Tribute Album (Star Music, 2017)

Singles

"Tanging Yaman"
"Aking Dasal" – Tagalog version of the song The Prayer (duet with Robert Seña)
"I've Fallen for You"
"Totoo Ba?"
"Hey It's Me"
"Pangako"
"Pangarap Ka Na Lang Ba? (Mahal Naman Kita)"
"Paniwalaan Mo"
"Paano Na"
"I'm Sorry"
"Kung Maghihintay Ka Lamang"
"People Alone"
"Sino Ako? (Hiram sa Diyos)"
"Awit Para sa 'Yo"
"Sige Na Naman (Crush Din Kita)" (1988)
"Will of the Wind"
"Love Is All That Matters"
"Jubilee Song" (with 92 AD)
"Tell the World of His Love" (composition and theme for World Youth Day 1995)
"Sa 'Yo Lamang"
"Panalangin sa Pagiging Bukas Palad"
"Kuya Pedro" (theme for the Canonization of Pedro Calungsod), composed by Rivera in 2012
"Araw-Araw Pasko"
"Ilang Pasko"
"Pasko Na, Sinta Ko"
"Purpose Driven Life"
"Stella Maris"
"My First and Last Love"
"Pagispan Mo Ang Boto Mo"
"Joy To The World"
"Disyembre Na Naman"
"My Valentine"
"And You Will Call Her Mother"
"Christmas Will Always Be Christmas"
"I'll Be There"
"Points of View" (duet with Manilyn Reynes)
"We Are All God's Children" (composition approved by the Vatican, performed during the Pope Francis' visit to the Philippines)
"Our Dearest Pope"
"Papa Francisco, Mabuhay Po Kayo!"
"Heal Our Land" (the video version of this song is directed by Mark Meily, associated with Star Music)
"Only Selfless Love" (performed during the 4th World Meeting of Families)
"O Hesus, Hilumin Mo"
"A Smile in Your Heart"
"Inang Maria"
"Sana Minsan"
"Bakit Ikaw Pa?"
"Letting Go"
"Second Thoughts" (duet with Rannie Raymundo)
"Sa Araw ng Pasko" (collaboration with Jeffrey Hidalgo, James Coronel, Pops Fernandez, Rocky Lazatin, Ladine Roxas, Richard Marten, Tootsie Guevarra, Carol Banawa, Lindsay Custodio, Jolina Magdangal and Roselle Nava)
"Pilipino Sa Turismo ay Aktibo" (theme for the Philippine Tourism Authority's B.E.S.T. in the Philippines campaign) (collaboration with Gary Valenciano, Ai-Ai delas Alas, Heart Evangelista, Piolo Pascual, Dianne dela Fuente, Ella Mae Saison, Angelica Jones, Vhong Navarro, Lito Camo, Sandwich, April Boy Regino, Aliyah Parcs, Karel Marquez, Gloc-9, Marinel Santos, Jonathan Badon, Michael Cruz, Michelle Ayalde, Erik Santos, Frenchie Dy, Sheryn Regis, Raki Vega, Akafellas, Johann Escañan, Divo Bayer, and King Girado)
"Pasko Para Sa Lahat" (collaboration with Manilyn Reynes, Carlo Orosa, Ogie Alcasid, Janet Arnaiz, Ana Roces, Francis M, Keno, Jo Anne Lorenzana, Keempee de Leon, Lara de Leon, Viktoria, Eddie K, and Tateng "TK" Katindig)
"Sana Naman, Taumbayan" (collaboration with Ryan Cayabyab, Jed Madela, Robert Seña, Isay Alvarez-Seña, Maysh Baay, Myke Salomon, Jay Durias, Mitch Valdez, The Company, Mass Appeal Choir, Agot Isidro and Bayang Barrios)
"Salamat 2016" (collaboration with Yeng Constantino, Janella Salvador, Ylona Garcia, Bailey May, Angeline Quinto, Erik Santos, Kaye Cal, Marion Aunor, Daryl Ong, Bugoy Drilon, Liezel Garcia, Jovit Baldivino, Sue Ramirez, Inigo Pascual, Michael Pangilinan, Jed Madela, Morissette, Klarisse De Guzman, Jolina Magdangal, Juris, Vina Morales, Jona, Migz & Maya, Gloc-9, KZ Tandingan, Piolo Pascual, Kim Chiu, Xian Lim, Enchong Dee, Tim Pavino, Alex Gonzaga, Enrique Gil, Kathryn Bernardo, Daniel Padilla, Vice Ganda)
 "We Heal as One" (collaboration with Iñigo Pascual, Julie Anne San Jose, Jed Madela, Robert Seña, Isay Alvarez-Seña, Mark Bautista, Rita Daniela, Gary Valenciano, Paolo Valenciano, KZ Tandingan, Aicelle Santos, Ogie Alcasid, Menchu Lauchengco, Michael Williams, Alden Richards, Ken Chan, Christian Bautista, Sarah Geronimo, Martin Nievera, Pops Fernandez, Bamboo Mañalac, apl.de.ap, Lani Misalucha, and Lea Salonga)
 "Bayani ng Mundo" (collaboration with Dulce, Kuh Ledesma, Ivy Violan, Bayang Barrios, Kris Lawrence, Esang de Torres and Ladine Roxas)
 "We Give our Yes" (theme for the 500 Years of Christianity in the Philippines)

Filmography

Film
 Paniwalaan Mo (1993)
 The Breakup Playlist (2015)

Television

Other
 Liwanag ng Mundo : Simbahan at Pamilya (2003, Direct-to-Video)

Controversies

"My Life In Your Hands"
In August 2003, Jamie was accused for incorrect lyrics involving one of its songs, "My Life In Your Hands" from her 2001 album, Seasons. The song was composed by Kathy Troccoli and Bill Montvilo, and originally performed by Troccoli in 1994 and later by Kirk Franklin in 1997. In Jamie's version of that song, the lyrics was eventually changed, including the words "People" replacing "Keeping" and "Love" replaces "Hope" in the chorus, and the word "Stone" replacing "Lord" in the coda. Careers-BMG Music Publishing and Floating Note Music, publishers of that song, did not granting the permission for inclusion of the song in the album released by her label, Star Music. In addition, they eventually misspelled the composers' names in the album's liner notes. Narciso Chan, the sales and marketing director of BMG Pilipinas (now Sony Music Philippines) says that the incorrect lyrics, the misspelling of the song's composers and uncrediting of the publishers of the song "My Life In Your Hands" is 'blatantly illegal' under the United States copyright laws. Nixon Sy, Star Music's assistant marketing director, did not receive the letter from Mr. Chan and the company had decline to comment. Star Music's VP for operations Annabelle Regaldo, managing director Enrico Santos and marketing director Heinrich Ngo said that her album Seasons will reissued with correct lyrics of the song "My Life In Your Hands" in October 2003, with the correction of the song composers' names and inclusion of the publisher's credits in the album's liner notes, as well as three additional tracks for the 2003 re-release of the album.

References

External links
Official website

1966 births
Living people
Filipino women pop singers
Filipino gospel singers
Filipino musical theatre actresses
Filipino Roman Catholics
Star Music artists
University of Santo Tomas alumni